Adalberto Peña Rivera (July 11, 1959 – January 19, 2023) was a Puerto Rican shortstop in Major League Baseball who played for the Houston Astros in , and from  to . Peña played only 88 games for the Astros across his six seasons, most of them as a late-inning defensive replacement; about half his games were played after rosters were expanded in September. His most productive season was in 1985, when he batted .276 in 20 games. He later managed for three seasons in the independent Atlantic League, and led the Puerto Rican team in the 2005 Baseball World Cup and 2006 Central American and Caribbean Games.

Career
Peña's professional career extended for 12 seasons, 1977–1988.  Although he appeared in parts of six years in the majors, he spent most of the seasons from 1981 to 1987 with the Triple-A Tucson Toros, where he had over 60 runs batted in three times.  In  he saw his most lengthy major league service, with 24 games played for Houston, and collecting his only big-league home run, hit off Ricky Horton of the St. Louis Cardinals on September 2 at Busch Stadium; it was Houston's only run in a 4–1 defeat.

In 88 major league games, Peña collected 31 hits, four of them doubles. He batted .231 in 1,224 minor league games.

Personal life and death
Bert's son, Roberto, is a professional baseball player.

Peña died on January 19, 2023, in Caguas, Puerto Rico, from esophageal cancer. He was 63.

See also
 List of Major League Baseball players from Puerto Rico

References

External links

1959 births
2023 deaths 
Major League Baseball shortstops
Houston Astros players
Major League Baseball players from Puerto Rico
Albany-Colonie Yankees players
Cocoa Astros players
Columbus Astros players
Columbus Clippers players
Daytona Beach Astros players
Tucson Toros players
Baseball managers
People from Santurce, Puerto Rico
Deaths from esophageal cancer 
Deaths from cancer in Puerto Rico